Meddegoda is a village in Sri Lanka. It is located within Western province, at a distance of 17 km from Colombo.

See also
List of towns in Central Province, Sri Lanka

References

External links

Populated places in Central Province, Sri Lanka